Micronola zahirii is a moth of the family Erebidae first described by Michael Fibiger in 2011. It is found in western Iran and western Azerbaijan.

The wingspan is about 10.5 mm. The head, patagia and anterior part of the thorax are grey brown. The posterior part of the thorax is light brown. The forewing ground colour (including fringes) is light brown and the crosslines are black brown. The hindwings are light brown. The underside of the forewings is unicolourous brown and the underside of the hindwings is beige without a discal spot. The abdomen is brown.

References

Micronoctuini
Taxa named by Michael Fibiger
Moths described in 2011